The 1993 NCAA Division III men's basketball tournament was the 19th annual single-elimination tournament to determine the national champions of National Collegiate Athletic Association (NCAA) men's Division III collegiate basketball in the United States.

For the first time, the championship rounds were contested in Buffalo, New York.

Ohio Northern defeated Augustana (IL), 71–68, in the final, earning their first NCAA Division III national title.

The Polar Bears (28–2) were coached by Joe Campoli.

Championship Rounds
Site: Buffalo, New York

See also
1993 NCAA Division I men's basketball tournament
1993 NCAA Division II men's basketball tournament
1993 NCAA Division III women's basketball tournament
1993 NAIA Division I men's basketball tournament

References

NCAA Division III men's basketball tournament
NCAA Men's Division III Basketball
Ncaa Tournament